John Anderson Fry is an American academic administrator, currently serving as the President of Drexel University. Fry formerly served as President of Franklin & Marshall College.

Early life 
John Anderson Fry was born in Brooklyn, New York City on May 28, 1960, and received an undergraduate degree in American Civilization from Lafayette College. He worked in accounting, during which time he received an MBA degree from the New York University Stern School of Business. He eventually worked in management consulting, specializing in universities.

Career

University of Pennsylvania 
One of Fry's clients in consulting was the University of Pennsylvania, and when he worked for the university, Judith Rodin, then President, hired him as Executive Vice President and Chief Operating Officer in 1995, a position he held until 2002. At the University of Pennsylvania he helped develop the "Agenda for Excellence", a comprehensive strategic plan covering from 1996 to 2001, and implemented a strategy addressing challenges in University City neighborhood to raise property values, reduce crime and attract commercial infrastructure and economic development.

Franklin & Marshall College 
Fry was the president of Franklin & Marshall College from 2002 to 2010. During his tenure, the average SAT score of students rose by 63 points over seven years, the ratio of students to faculty was lowered to 10:1, and the college created a faculty-led, student-governed College House system.

Drexel University 
On March 10, 2010, he was designated as the 14th President of Drexel University effective on August 1, 2010. He succeeded the interim President Celestino Pennoni, who served since the death of the 13th President Constantine Papadakis.

Fry's inaugural address set an early agenda featuring three major objectives: to make Drexel "one of academe's most powerful engines for neighborhood improvement and regional economic growth"; to "mobilize [Drexel's] entrepreneurial and creative energies to confront major threats to human health, economic prosperity, and the environment"; and to "[maximize] Drexel's global reputation and impact."

In 2011, Fry negotiated Drexel's affiliation with America's oldest natural history museum, The Academy of Natural Sciences of Philadelphia, creating The Academy of Natural Sciences of Drexel University. In 2012, Fry announced the completion of the Drexel strategic plan from 2012 to 2017, "Transforming the Modern Urban University."

Fundraising efforts have increased recently under Fry with great success. Recent gifts include $45 million from Dana and David Dornsife for the Dornsife School of Public Health and $50 million from Thomas R. Kline for the Kline School of Law. Faculty and staff participation rates in fundraising campaigns have also increased from 12 to 62 percent.

Fry is active in local and national matters of education and urban economic development. He served from 2014 to 2017 as a member of the board of directors of the American Council on Education. Fry was the founding chairman of the University City District and served a two-year term as chairman of the Chamber of Commerce for Greater Philadelphia, leaving the post in 2018.

Fry wore doctoral regalia at university ceremonies before receiving an honorary doctorate from Gratz College in 2019.

Personal life 
Fry and his wife Cara, an art historian, have three children.

Fry is also an avid squash player in his free time and the sport has thrived on campus under his leadership. Since 2011 the US Squash Open has been held on Drexel's campus in the Daskalakis Athletic Center. Fry was also Chair of the Board of Directors for US Squash from 2013 to 2016, and was instrumental in bringing the US Squash Open to Drexel.

References

External links 
John A. Fry at Drexel University
This Forbes College President is a Game Changer
Building a Showcase Campus, Using an I.O.U

Living people
Lafayette College alumni
New York University Stern School of Business alumni
1960 births
Presidents of Franklin & Marshall College